Mergo is a comune (municipality) in the Province of Ancona in the Italian region Marche, located about  southwest of Ancona.

Mergo borders the following municipalities: Arcevia, Cupramontana, Rosora, Serra San Quirico.

Demographic evolution

References

Cities and towns in the Marche